HMS Aurora was a  of the Royal Navy (RN). Like other ships of the class, Aurora was named after a figure of mythology, Aurora being the Roman equivalent of the Greek goddess Eos.

History
Aurora was built by John Brown & Company, shipbuilders of Clydebank, Scotland. Aurora was launched on 28 November 1962 and commissioned on 9 April 1964.

Aurora became the leader of the 2nd Frigate Squadron in 1964. From 1967 to 1968, Derek Bazalgette served her as Commanding Officer. On 17 April 1968, her Westland Wasp ASW helicopter from 829 Naval Air Squadron crashed off South Africa.

In August 1969, Aurora, together with the American destroyer  and the French destroyer , took part in the commemorations at Théoule-sur-Mer of the 25th anniversary of Operation Dragoon, the Allied invasion of Southern France. From 1970 to 1971, Paul Greening served as her Commanding Officer. In 1972, during the Second Cod War, Aurora came to the aid of an Icelandic fishing vessel that had caught fire, rescuing its crew in the process. Soon after this incident, Aurora underwent modernisation which included the addition of the Ikara anti-submarine warfare (ASW) missile launcher that in effect changed the Batch One ships, of which Aurora was part, into a specialised ASW batch rather than its original role as a general-purpose batch. The modernisation was completed in 1976.

In 1978, Aurora joined the Fishery Protection Squadron, undertaking patrols and other duties in support of British fishing interests around the UK. She remained with the squadron until she was eventually transferred to the 7th Frigate Squadron, which was stationed in the Far East, just as the RN presence in that region was being reduced. Further duties were undertaken by Aurora across the world, but in 1987, due to defence cuts, as well as manpower shortages, a common problem for the RN at that time, Aurora was decommissioned.

References

 HMS Aurora (Clydebuilt Ships Database) (Retrieved February 2010)
 1967–1969 Ship's Logs. National Archives, Kew

Publications
 
 Marriott, Leo, 1983.  Royal Navy Frigates 1945-1983, Ian Allan Ltd.  

 

Leander-class frigates
1962 ships
Ships built on the River Clyde